Black Panties is the twelfth studio album by American R&B singer R. Kelly. It was released in the United States on December 6, 2013, by RCA Records. The album features guest appearances from Ludacris, 2 Chainz, Young Jeezy, Migos, Kelly Rowland, Juicy J and Future.

Background
Black Panties, as says Kelly, "is the new 12 Play (1993)", and that it is different from his previous albums Love Letter (2010) and Write Me Back (2012). In October 2013, in an interview with Rolling Stone, R. Kelly spoke about why he wanted to make the album sound similar to his 1993 debut album, 12 Play, saying: "I love that I can play around with all types of music. I did Love Letter and Write Me Back and those were fun albums for me to do, because they took me back to music I love. But, I wanted to change lanes with this new album and remind people of the TP-2.com and 12 Play style of music I can do — 'Kellz music!' I like that I can change lanes and do all different kinds of music. Fans can never accuse R. Kelly of doing the same thing, I keep mixing it up." In December 2013, in an interview with Billboard, R. Kelly spoke about why he decided to name the album Black Panties, saying: "I’m on stage doing the Love Letter tour and I was singing “Seems Like You're Ready”. Every time I'm singing, panties start flying out of everywhere. Seriously. But this particular night, a pair of mediums came out of the sky and they were black and they landed on my wrist. Immediately I looked at that and looked up like “that’s a sign”. Yeah, the idea hit me right away." Collaborator Jeremih revealed in an interview that he had not been in the studio together with Kelly for the recording process of "Switch Up", but described the working experience as "dope".

Singles
On July 28, 2013 the album's first single "My Story", was released and later peaked at number 89 on the US Billboard Hot 100

On September 24, 2013, the album's second single "Genius" was released.

On November 25, 2013, the album's third single "Cookie" was released. On December 10, 2013, a music video was released for single "Cookie".

"Legs Shakin'" was sent to US urban contemporary radio stations on March 11, 2014, as the album's fourth single.

Critical reception 

Upon its release, Black Panties received mixed reviews from music critics. At Metacritic, which assigns a normalized rating out of 100 to reviews from mainstream critics, the album received an average score of 61, based on 19 reviews, indicating "generally positive reviews". Andy Kellman of AllMusic gave the album two and a half stars out of five, saying "After Love Letter and Write Me Back, classy and relatively polite throwback albums, R. Kelly reverts to sexually exaggerated and wholly contemporary content for Black Panties. Kelly, joined by a deep roster of fellow songwriters and producers, dispenses with the strings, horns, and dashing charm, and dishes out sleaze by the bucket over modern backdrops that slink and whir. All the material is slow and mostly pared down, made to maximize space for his still generous supply of hooks and outlandish rhymes." Nick Catucci of Entertainment Weekly gave the album a B, saying "Black Panties won't humanize the man for anyone who prefers caricature. But his 12th album, a return to wafting sex jams after two soulful dance discs, also falls short of the Kelly we love: the tireless entertainer-as-lover and suavely esoteric devotee of churchy theatrics, inspirational-poster slogans, Chicago stepping music, and extreme wordplay." Greg Kot of the Chicago Tribune gave the album two out of four stars, saying "After two albums of elegant, old-school stepping music, R. Kelly is back doing the raunch. Black Panties is a musically detailed, sonically rich porn soundtrack, a formula that has helped the singer sell more than 50 million albums worldwide in two decades." Omar Burgess of HipHopDX gave the album three and a half stars out of five, saying "Black Panties finds his subject matter about as varied as the play-by-play of two dogs in heat. But what it lacks in lyrical depth it makes up for by being a catchy, entertaining and completely in the moment snapshot of the current turned up, hybrid of R&B and Rap for clubs and bedrooms."

Marah Eakin of The A.V. Club gave the album a B−, saying "Whether Kelly consciously meant to make it one or not, Black Panties could be a big step forward for the sex-positive movement. Or it could just be another R. Kelly record." Jason King of Spin gave the album a five out of ten, saying "Black Panties also happens to be a serious musical step backwards from the melodious Write Me Back. The production is suitably retro 1990s-meets-contemporary-hip-hop: Synth strings and gated drums are matched to pitched-down, chopped & screwed vocals. But the songwriting is the big problem: These are serviceable but mediocre and tuneless slow jams. Then again, no one thinks of 12 Play'''s “I Like the Crotch on You” as lyrically or musically transcendent, either." Jordan Sargent of Pitchfork Media gave the album a 6.8 out of 10, saying "With Black Panties, what you see is mostly what you get. What we get is a pretty good modern R&B album, but it’s also one that feels just a bit fossilized. With its undulating synths, abundance of screwed vocals and slowly churning tempos, Black Panties sounds suspiciously like the-Dream’s first two albums." Ryan B. Patrick of Exclaim! gave the album a four out of ten, saying "Ultimately, there isn't much to recommend with Black Panties. Kelly is crazy talented, but has always been at his best when he controls his obsessions, not the other way around. Dogged by personal scandals for the better portion of his career, Kelly is unrepentant, unfazed, and unaware that just because he's in on the joke doesn't make it any less funny."

Commercial performance
The album debuted at number 4 on the Billboard 200 chart, with first-week sales of 133,000 copies in the United States. It is R. Kelly's highest-charting album since Untitled (2009) debuted at number four. In its second week, the album fell to number 15 and sold 60,000 more copies, a 55% drop from its first week sales. In its third week, the album sold 44,000 more copies in the United States, falling two spots to number 17. In its fourth week, the album sold 31,000 more copies and rose to number 11 on the US Billboard'' 200. As of October 2015, the album has sold 462,000 copies in the United States.

Track listing

Notes
 signifies an assistant producer

Personnel
Credits adapted from AllMusic.

2 Chainz - Featured Artist
Mikely Adam - Composer, Producer
J. Angel - Composer
David Anthony - Producer
Chris Athens - Mastering
Jonathan Azu - Management
Diana Copeland - Executive Assistant
Mario Bakovic - Composer, Producer
Bigg Makk - Keyboards, Producer
Sam Bohl - Assistant, Assistant Engineer
Theola Borden - Publicity
Andre "Drizza Don" Bridges - Engineer
Chris Bridges - Composer
Antonio Brown - Composer
Coran Capshaw - Management
Cardo - Producer
Chris Clark - Engineer, Producer
The Closers - Producer
Daniel Coriglie - Composer, Producer
Winfred Crabtree II - Composer
Da Beat Mechanix - Producer
DJ Wayne Williams - A&R
Lamar Edwards - Composer, Producer
Tauheed Epps - Composer
Meghan Foley - Art Direction, Design
Kristen Foster - Publicity
Abel Garibaldi - Engineer, Mixing, Programming
Brisha Hemby - Make-Up
Dave Huffman - Mastering
Jaycen Joshua - Mixing
Jeezy - Featured Artist
Paul Jefferies - Composer
Jay Jenkins - Composer
Rebecca Johnson - Composer

Sly Jordan - Composer
Ryan Kaul - Assistant
R. Kelly - Arranger, Composer, Creative Director, Mixing, Primary Artist, Producer
Brock Korsan - Composer
Ron LaTour - Composer
Ludacris - Featured Artist
Donnie Lyle - Guitar, Music Direction
Cheryl A. Mack - Assistant
Fabian Marasciullo - Mixing
Dorrell Mays - Composer
Dijon McFarlane - Composer, Producer
Ian Mereness - Engineer, Mixing, Programming
Destin Reza Mungall - Composer
Rich Nice - Producer
Lauren Nikooz - Production Design
Megan Nimerosky - Assistant
Nineteen85 - Producer
Chiquita Oden - Grooming
Anthony Patterson - Assistant
Dennis-Manuel Peters - Composer, Producer
Rahk - Producer
Aaron Revelle- Composer
Antonio Rey - Vocal Engineer
April Rommet - Stylist
Kelly Rowland - Featured Artist
Zane Shoemake - Assistant
Darrick Stephens - Creative Director, Producer
Randee St. Nicholas - Photography
Ryan Supple - Assistant
Carolyn Williams - Product Manager
Win - Producer
Young Jeezy - Featured Artist

Charts

Weekly charts

Year-end charts

Certifications

Release history

References

2013 albums
Albums produced by R. Kelly
R. Kelly albums
RCA Records albums
Albums produced by DJ Mustard
Albums produced by Cardo
Albums produced by Mars (record producer)
Albums produced by Nineteen85